Umesh Lakshan (born 11 October 1999) is a Sri Lankan cricketer. He made his Twenty20 debut on 8 January 2020, for Lankan Cricket Club in the 2019–20 SLC Twenty20 Tournament. He made his first-class debut on 14 March 2020, for Lankan Cricket Club in the 2019–20 Premier League Tournament.

References

External links
 

1999 births
Living people
Sri Lankan cricketers
Lankan Cricket Club cricketers
Place of birth missing (living people)